Humberto Tomassina (12 September 1898 – 12 June 1981) was a Uruguayan footballer.

He was a member of Uruguay squad which won gold medal at 1924 Olympics. He was also part of national team which won 1923 South American Championship at home soil, even though he didn't play any match in the tournament. He played club football for Liverpool Montevideo.

References

External links

 profile

1898 births
1981 deaths
Uruguayan footballers
Footballers at the 1924 Summer Olympics
Olympic footballers of Uruguay
Olympic gold medalists for Uruguay
Medalists at the 1924 Summer Olympics
Uruguay international footballers
Liverpool F.C. (Montevideo) players
Olympic medalists in football
Copa América-winning players
Association football defenders